Jean Frederic Kouadio N'Guessan (born 17 April 2003) is an Ivorian professional footballer who plays as a midfielder for  club Nîmes on loan from  club Nice.

Career
In 2021, N'Guessan was sent on loan to Swiss side Lausanne-Sport from Nice in the French Ligue 1. On 24 July 2021, he debuted for Lausanne-Sport during a 2–1 loss to St. Gallen.

In July 2022, N'Guessan moved on loan to Nîmes for the 2022–23 season.

References

External links
 
 
 Swiss Super League profile

Living people
2003 births
Ivorian footballers
Association football midfielders
Ligue 1 (Ivory Coast) players
Swiss Super League players
OGC Nice players
FC Lausanne-Sport players
Nîmes Olympique players
Ivorian expatriate footballers
Ivorian expatriate sportspeople in France
Expatriate footballers in France
Ivorian expatriate sportspeople in Switzerland
Expatriate footballers in Switzerland